Deyo is a surname. Notable people with the surname include:

 Abraham A. Deyo (1793–1873), New York politician
 Amanda Deyo (1838–1917) American Universalist minister, pacifist, and correspondent
 Andre Deyo (born 1978), American R&B singer and songwriter, better known by his stage name mrDEYO
 Blanche Deyo (died 1933), American Broadway actress and vaudeville dancer
 Jeff Deyo (born 1969), American Contemporary Christian music solo artist and worship leader
 Martin W. Deyo (1902–1951), New York politician and judge
 Morton Deyo (1887–1973), US Navy admiral
 Peter Deyo (born 1957), American sprint canoer
 Solomon Deyo (1850–1922), the engineer in charge of constructing the first line of the New York City Subway
 Tony Deyo, comedian from New York City

See also
 DuBois-Deyo House, a historic home in Rosendale, Ulster County, New York
 USS Deyo, a US Navy destroyer